Golden Globe Award for Best Supporting Actress may refer to:

Golden Globe Award for Best Supporting Actress – Motion Picture
Golden Globe Award for Best Supporting Actress – Series, Miniseries or Television Film